Nick Jordan may refer to:

 Nick Jordan (character), a fictional doctor from BBC's Casualty and Holby City
 Nick Jordan (politician) (born 1949), Kansas State Senator
 Nick Jordan (artist) (born 1967), British visual artist and filmmaker